Derio L. Gambaro (born December 6, 1955) is an American politician.  He previously served in the Missouri House of Representatives where he represented a portion of South St. Louis including The Hill and Dogtown neighborhoods.  He is a Democrat.

Gambaro grew up in St. Louis and graduated from St. Louis University High School.  He attended the United States Air Force Academy for two years and graduated from St. Louis University in 1979. Gambaro and his wife, Linda, live on the St. Louis Hill with their four children: Anna, Derio J., Catherine, and Margaret, and also his son-in-law Pat McIver.

In 1998, Gambaro was elected State Representative, defeating incumbent Tom Bauer   in the Democratic primary election.  Gambaro was re-elected in 2000 and did not seek re-election in 2002.  He later served on the St. Louis board of election commissioners.

In 2006, after several years out of elective office, Gambaro was an unsuccessful candidate for the 4th District Missouri State Senate seat being vacated by Pat Dougherty.  The Democratic primary election was heavily contested, and no Republicans or third party candidates sought the seat.  Gambaro finished third in the race, behind political science instructor Jeff Smith and State Representative Yaphett El-Amin, but ahead of State Representative Amber Boykins, and former St. Louis Alderman Kenny Jones .

Governor Blunt appointed Gambaro to the Missouri State Board of Education in June 2007.

References

External links
KWMU 2006 election guide

Members of the Missouri House of Representatives
1955 births
Living people
Politicians from St. Louis
American people of Italian descent